Toomsboro is a town in Wilkinson County, Georgia, United States. The population was 472 at the 2010 census.

History
Toomsboro was founded when the Central of Georgia Railway was extended to that point. Its railroad terminal was built in 1869.

On August 30, 1871, Matthew Deason, a white man, and an African American woman who was possibly his wife, Serena Dul Cat C. Johnson (Georgia Marriages 1699–1944 in Wilkinson County Georgia)  were lynched in Toomsboro by members of the Ku Klux Klan. Deason, a former Confederate soldier, was the elected sheriff of Wilkinson County. It was the first documented lynching of a black woman in Georgia after the Civil War.

The Georgia General Assembly incorporated Toomsboro as a town in 1904. The community is named for 18th-century Georgia politician Robert Toombs.

Freedom, Georgia

David Bumgardner, a developer who bought properties at auction, intended to turn the property he owned into a quaint tourist destination. In April 2012, Bumgardner and Bill Lucado, who also owned property, announced they were seeking a buyer for the properties by advertising "Toomsboro for sale" although the existing community of Toomsboro maintains its own identity. They suggested a movie production company might be interested in using Toomsboro as a film set. In September 2018, 36 pieces of property over  went up for sale for an asking price of $1.7 million, with an eye toward a preservation-minded buyer "who appreciates its history". In the aftermath of the murder of Ahmaud Arbery in 2020, 19 families cooperatively bought  of land in Toomsboro to establish a Black community "where all Black people feel safe without fear of being murdered for who they are". The Freedom Georgia Initiative promotes the new community as Freedom, Georgia.

Geography

Toomsboro is located at  (32.825423, -83.083196).

Demographics

As of the census of 2000, there were 622 people, 209 households, and 146 families residing in the town. The racial makeup of the town was 45.02% White, 53.70% African American, 0.80% from other races, and 0.48% from two or more races. Hispanic or Latino of any race were 0.80% of the population.

There were 209 households, out of which 30.6% had children under the age of 18 living with them, 39.2% were married couples living together, 26.8% had a female householder with no husband present, and 29.7% were non-families. 28.7% of all households were made up of individuals, and 13.9% had someone living alone who was 65 years of age or older.  The average household size was 2.69 and the average family size was 3.32.

In the town, the population was spread out, with 25.1% under the age of 18, 7.7% from 18 to 24, 24.4% from 25 to 44, 20.1% from 45 to 64, and 22.7% who were 65 years of age or older.  The median age was 39 years. For every 100 females, there were 77.2 males.  For every 100 females age 18 and over, there were 71.3 males.

The median income for a household in the town was $26,250, and the median income for a family was $36,250. Males had a median income of $27,321 versus $23,250 for females. The per capita income for the town was $13,679.  About 15.6% of families and 22.7% of the population were below the poverty line, including 29.0% of those under age 18 and 24.0% of those age 65 or over.

Notes

Towns in Wilkinson County, Georgia
Towns in Georgia (U.S. state)